The Denmark women's national football team has represented Denmark at the FIFA Women's World Cup on four occasions, in 1991, 1995, 1999, and 2007.

FIFA Women's World Cup record

*Draws include knockout matches decided on penalty kicks.

Record by opponent

1991 FIFA Women's World Cup

Group A

Quarterfinals

1995 FIFA Women's World Cup

Group C

Quarterfinals

1999 FIFA Women's World Cup

Group A

2007 FIFA Women's World Cup

Group D

2023 FIFA Women's World Cup

Group D

Goalscorers

References

 
World Cup
Countries at the FIFA Women's World Cup